Türkmən (also, Tyurkman and Tyurkmen) is a village and municipality in the Barda Rayon of Azerbaijan.  It has a population of 1,241.

References

Populated places in Barda District